KQBQ (100.1 FM) is a radio station licensed to serve the community of Meyersville, Texas. The station is owned by Rufus Resources, LLC, and airs a classic country format as part of a group of stations branded as the "No Bull Radio Network".

The station was assigned the KQBQ call letters by the Federal Communications Commission on January 20, 2017.

References

External links
 Official Website
 FCC Public Information File for KQBQ
 

QBQ
Radio stations established in 2017
2017 establishments in Texas
Classic country radio stations in the United States
DeWitt County, Texas